Calhoun County is the name of several counties in the United States of America named after U.S. Vice President John C. Calhoun:

 Calhoun County, Alabama
 Calhoun County, Arkansas
 Calhoun County, Florida
 Calhoun County, Georgia
 Calhoun County, Illinois
 Calhoun County, Iowa
 Calhoun County, Michigan
 Calhoun County, Mississippi
 Calhoun County, South Carolina
 Calhoun County, Texas 
 Calhoun County, West Virginia

See also
 USS Calhoun County (LST-519), a World War II U.S. tank landing ship